Ensemble Santenay is an early music ensemble, originating in the Institute of Early Music in Trossingen, Germany. It was established in May 2004 by four musicians of four different nationalities specialising in their studies in the historically informed interpretation and performance of music from the 14th and 15th centuries, late Middle Ages and Early Renaissance.

The formation of the ensemble using voice and instruments (copies of original instruments) perfectly suits the music of the Burgundian courts known as the Chansons Courtoises and reveals its poetical character along with its complex polyphony.

Musicians 
 Julla Schmidt – voice, organetto
 Elodie Wiemer – recorders
 Szilárd Chereji – vielle
 Ori Harmelin – lute

External links
 
 Staatliche Hochschule fuer Musik Trossingen 

Mixed early music groups
Medieval musical groups
Musical groups established in 2004